The Liebenauer Stadium, sponsored as the Merkur-Arena (formerly known as the Arnold Schwarzenegger Stadium and UPC-Arena) is in the Liebenau area of Graz, Styria, Austria. The ground is the home of the football clubs SK Sturm Graz and Grazer AK.

History
Originally, the stadium was named after bodybuilder, actor and former governor of the U.S. state of California, Arnold Schwarzenegger, who was born near Graz. It was built from 1996 to early 1997 and is owned by Stadion Liebenau Betriebs GmbH. It opened with the game Grazer AK vs. SK Sturm Graz on 9 July 1997 (0:4).

In December 2005, when Schwarzenegger did not stop the execution of Stanley Tookie Williams, an intense discussion in his hometown began about what to do with the stadium that bore his name. After some days, Schwarzenegger revoked the city of Graz's right to the use of his name, ending the debate. On the night of 26 December 2005 the name was removed from the stadium. The remaining part Stadion Graz-Liebenau was removed on 17 February 2006 and on 18 February 2006 the stadium was renamed to UPC-Arena. In March 2016 the Austrian insurance company Merkur Versicherung secured the rights to bear a name and the stadium was renamed to Merkur-Arena.

Facts 
The Merkur-Arena has an official capacity of 15,400 in 27 sectors. The away fans are normally in sector 8, which has a capacity of about 750. When more away fans are expected, sector 9 with about 750 seats is also given to the away team and sometimes even also sector 10. At Champions League games of the SK Sturm Graz, some additional platforms were built so that the stadium had a capacity of 16,000 spectators. Furthermore, the stadium has a wheelchair area.
The first game in the "new" UPC-Arena was the 125th derby between SK Sturm Graz and Grazer AK (4:0).
The field equipped with undersoil heating has a size of 105 x 68 metres.

The stadium hosted a World Cup qualifier between Austria and Faroe Islands on 5 September 2009 which ended in 3–1 victory for the home team. It also hosted an international friendly between England and Japan on 30 May 2010. England had been training in Irdning, a small village in the Austrian Alps, in preparation for the 2010 FIFA World Cup. The match ended 2–1 to England, courtesy of two own goals by Japan.

Average attendance
The average season attendances from league matches held at the Merkur-Arena for Grazer AK and SK Sturm Graz.

* Dissolved after 6 matches.

Sponsors
From 2006 to 2016 the stadium was sponsored by UPC Austria, and was known as the UPC-Arena

Merkur Versicherung won the sponsorship rights from 2016. The contract is set to last for 10 years until 2026.

References

External links 

  Homepage of Merkur Insurance Austria
  Homepage of SK Sturm Graz
  Homepage of Grazer AK
  UPC-Arena

Football venues in Austria
SK Sturm Graz
Grazer AK
Buildings and structures in Graz
Sport in Graz
Tourist attractions in Graz
American football venues in Austria
1997 establishments in Austria
Sports venues completed in 1997
20th-century architecture in Austria